Jackson Township is one of eleven townships in Randolph County, Indiana, United States. As of the 2010 census, its population was 619 and it contained 250 housing units.

History
Jackson Township was established in 1833.

Geography

Unincorporated towns
 New Lisbon at 
 New Pittsburg at 
(This list is based on USGS data and may include former settlements.)

References

External links
 Indiana Township Association
 United Township Association of Indiana

Townships in Randolph County, Indiana
Townships in Indiana